Radomierowice  is a village in the administrative district of Gmina Murów, within Opole County, Opole Voivodeship, in south-western Poland.

Notable residents
 Erich Pietzonka (1906-1989), Fallschirmjäger officer

References

Radomierowice